Eyn ol Baqar (also Romanized as ‘Eyn ol Baqar; also known as Ainubagal, ‘Ain ul Baghal, ‘Eyn ol Baghal, and ‘Eyn ol Baghl) is a village in Sharifabad Rural District, in the Central District of Sirjan County, Kerman Province, Iran. At the 2006 census, its population was 132, in 31 families.

References 

Populated places in Sirjan County